Kevin López may refer to:

Kevin López (runner) (born 1990), Spanish runner
Kevin López (footballer) (born 1996), Honduran footballer